Santosh Subramaniam (spelt Santhosh Subramaniyam onscreen) is a 2008 Indian Tamil-language romantic comedy film directed by Mohan Raja and produced by Kalpathi S. Agoram. The film stars Jayam Ravi and Genelia while Prakash Raj, Geetha and Sayaji Shinde play supporting roles. It is a remake of the Telugu film, Bommarillu (2006). Genelia, Raj, and Satya Krishnan reprise their roles in the film, which revolves around a father and son relationship; the father dotes on his son, who resents the same. The son's choices and his ambitions to achieve something in life are subdued by his father.

The film entered production in July 2007 and in addition to being shot in India, was also shot at the South Island of New Zealand. The film's soundtrack was composed by Devi Sri Prasad, who retained most of the tunes he composed for Bommarillu.

Santosh Subramaniam was released on 11 April 2008 during the Tamil New Year festival. The film was positively received and commercially successful; critics praised the performances of Ravi, Genelia and Prakash Raj. The film won the third prize for the Best Film at the Tamil Nadu State Film Awards of 2008. It was nominated for four awards at the 56th Filmfare Awards South, including Best Film, Best Director, Best Actor and Best Actress, but did not win in any category.

Plot 
Subramaniam is a rich businessman managing his own construction company. He lives with his wife Shanthi and sons Sanjay and Santosh. Subramaniam cares for his family a lot and excessively dotes upon his children. Santosh, the younger son, does not like this as he wants to be independent and free from his father's guidance and control. But Santosh acts normally to avoid hurting his father. Santosh has in mind that both his career and wife should be of his choice only and not of his father. Subramaniam wants Santosh to assist him in managing the company but Santosh dreams of starting a new company on his own and does not prefer to work in his father's company. Meanwhile, Subramaniam arranges Santosh's wedding with Rajeshwari, daughter of his friend Ramamoorthy. Santosh is shocked as he has no other option rather than agreeing for this wedding.

One day, Santosh meets Hasini, a college student and is immediately attracted seeing her childish attitude and jovial nature. Santosh slowly befriends Hasini and both fall in love, but he does not have the courage to inform about his love to his father. Santosh gets spotted along with Hasini by Subramaniam and now he reveals his love affair. Subramaniam is furious upon hearing this as Santosh is already engaged to Rajeshwari. Subramaniam asks Santosh to bring Hasini to his home and make her stay with them for a week so that he will make Santosh understand that Rajeshwari is the better bride for him. Santosh agrees, believing that Hasini will impress Subramaniam. Hasini lies to her father Govindan that she is going for a college trip and leaves for Santosh's home.

Everyone at Subramaniam's home view Hasini indifferently seeing her talkative nature compared to Subramaniam's family members who are more mature and not so talkative, especially Subramaniam. Santosh asks Hasini to try impressing his family members, fearing Subramaniam might not accept for the wedding. Slowly, Hasini starts befriending Santosh's mother and sisters and gets close with them. Hasini informs them about Santosh's behaviours such as alcohol consumption, going out at night to meet her, and his plans of getting a bank loan to start his own company which were not known to Santosh's family before.

Santosh is shocked knowing that Hasini has revealed all his mischievous activities and berates her often for being childish. Hasini worries and decides to leave Santosh's home even before the one-week time given to her. She apologises to everyone in Santosh's home and says that she is not the one fit for him and his family. Santosh is worried seeing this but has no option rather than staying calm as even Subramaniam did not like Hasini.

The next day, an argument erupts between Santosh and Subramaniam during which the former becomes emotional and shouts that he has lost so many small things in life because of Subramaniam. But he preferred to stay calm as he does not want to hurt his father. Subramaniam realises his mistake and apologises to everyone saying that he always wanted to take care of his family members so well but had never thought that they are sacrificing a lot to make him happy.

Santosh meets Rajeshwari and apologises to her. He also makes her understand his situation. Rajeshwari convinces Ramamoorthy that she will get a better groom than Santosh. Meanwhile, Subramaniam goes to meet Hasini and apologises to her. Hasini says that her father is angry on her for lying and she will have to obey her father now. But Govindan does not like Santosh as he has seen him before drinking with his friends in road. Subramaniam says that he will send Santosh to Govindan's home for a week so that he will better understand his character. After numerous incidents between Govindan and Santosh, the former finally agrees for Santosh and Hasini's wedding.

Cast

Production 
Despite early indications that the same team that worked on the 2006 Telugu film Bommarilluincluding director K. Vijaya Bhaskar and producer Dil Rajuwould remake the film in Tamil, the pair said they were not interested. Raju was willing to sell the remake rights and held twenty previews in Chennai for potential buyers. Editor Mohan, under his home company Jayam Combines, outbid Prakash Raj, who wanted to remake the film with Vishal in the lead role. Others outbid included Vijay, K. Bhagyaraj for his daughter, Saranya, and A. M. Rathnam for his son Ravi Krishna. Mohan handed the director's role to his first son Raja, and the lead role to his second son Jayam Ravi. The film would become Raja's fourth consecutive remake of a Telugu film. Bhaskar stated that he chose not to work on the remake because he had "invested too much time and energy in its original".

The remake, titled Santosh Subramaniam, had its launch on 16 July 2007 with the attendance of all the lead actors. For the inauguration function, 300 invitations by word of mouth were made. The invitation for the launch featured many successful father-son duos from various fields, such as Sivaji Ganesan and Prabhu, Sivakumar and Suriya, and Sathyaraj and Sibiraj. Genelia D'Souza was chosen to play the female lead Hasini, reprising her role from the original film. Prakash Raj, who also acted in the original film, was chosen to reprise his role as the protagonist's father. Former cricketer Sadagoppan Ramesh made his acting debut in this film, playing Santosh's elder brother. Raja felt he resembled Ravi. Anu Hasan makes a special appearance as a woman who Santosh converses with at the beginning, and end of the film. She said she accepted the role because "I have always believed that there is no small role, only small actors".

Two songs were shot at the South Island of New Zealand. An advantage of shooting in New Zealand for the film's crew was that they had 16 hours of sunlight on any given day. Some sequences were even shot around 9:30 pm under "blazing sunlight". One song depicting the marriage of Premgi Amaran's character was shot in several temples "in and around Kumbakonam" in Tamil Nadu. According to Raja, the film was inspired by his own life: "My friend took the essence of my story and made the Telugu blockbuster, which I then remade in Tamil".

Soundtrack 

For the film's music and soundtrack, Raja renewed his association with Devi Sri Prasad, who predominantly used his tracks from the original film. Siddharth, the lead actor in the original, sang the number "Adada Adada Adada", making his debut as a playback singer in Tamil cinema. The audio of the film was released on 23 March 2008, three weeks before the film's release.

The soundtrack received positive response. Behindwoods rated the album 3.5 out of 5, calling it "Overall, a lively album all set to become a chart buster." Rediff rated the album 3 out of 5, and stated that "listening to Santosh Subramaniyam music really gives santhosham".

Release and reception 

Santosh Subramaniam was released on 11 April 2008 during the Tamil New Year festival. Despite being released during the season of the Indian Premier League, it took a big opening and enjoyed a theatrical run of one hundred days due to positive critical reviews and favourable word of mouth.

The reception in the United Kingdom, comparatively for a Tamil film, was equally successful, entering the UK box office at number 40. The film collected  in its first week of opening and earned a cumulative gross of £24,962 in its three-week box office run.

Critical reception 
Pavithra Srinivasan of Rediff gave the film a rating of two and a half out of five; she called the film a "classy remake of the Telugu blockbuster Bommarillu (Toy-house), the movie is a love-story but it strives to be something even more". She stated that Ravi "performs with his usual flair", D'Souza's character "appears a little too good to be true, at first. But her character grows on you", and praised Prakash Raj's performance, saying that the role "was a cakewalk" for him. Malathi Rangarajan of The Hindu praised the music, locations and the main cast's performances, and wrote that in the film, "dull moments are rare, enjoyable ones aplenty". IndiaGlitz said, "Hats off director Raja and Jeyam Ravi for hitting the bull's eye for the fourth time in a row. The duo continues from where they left in Unakum Enakum to provide a feel-good light-hearted family entertainer sure to be enjoyed with the family." and concluded, "Santosh Subramaniam is no doubt a film that is sure to spread santhosam (happiness) to one and all."

Sify said D'Souza's portrayal is "the soul of the film" and its "biggest strength"; the reviewer called Ravi's performance "mature" and Prakash Raj's "outstanding". Behindwoods gave the film three stars out of five and called it a "well made family entertainer". The reviewer wrote, "watch Santosh Subramaniam for that 'feel good' feeling, overlook minor glitches", and said that Prakash Raj is "the real master" who "proves his class yet again". Settu Shankar of Oneindia said, "there are few minuses in the script but those are very minor and not affect the flow of the story" and concluded, "overall, Santosh Subramaniam is a promising entertainer that brings the first word of the title in every viewers mind for long time even after come out from the theatre".

Accolades

Footnotes

References

External links 
 

2000s romantic musical films
2000s Tamil-language films
2008 films
2008 romantic comedy films
Films directed by Mohan Raja
Films scored by Devi Sri Prasad
Films shot in New Zealand
Indian romantic comedy films
Indian romantic musical films
Tamil remakes of Telugu films